"Shit happens" is a common slang phrase meaning that events (especially unfortunate) occur every day, all the time.

Shit happens may also refer to:
Shit Happens, a DVD by the band Every Time I Die
"Shit Happens", the second episode of the second season of TV series Bad Girls